Iryna Vladimirovna Shymanovich (born 30 June 1997) is a Belarusian tennis player.

She has won 13 singles and 12 doubles titles on the ITF Women's Circuit. On 30 January 2023, she reached her best singles ranking of world No. 224. On 20 February 2023, she peaked at No. 166 in the WTA doubles rankings.

Juniors
At the 2013 Wimbledon Championships, she finished runner-up in girls' doubles with Anhelina Kalinina.

Fed Cup
On 4 February 2014, she made her debut for the Belarus Fed Cup team, winning her first international rubber with Ilona Kremen in doubles against the team of Turkey.

ITF finals

Singles: 17 (13 titles, 4 runner–ups)

Doubles: 26 (12 titles, 14 runner–ups)

Fed Cup/Billie Jean King Cup participation

Doubles (2–1)

Junior Grand Slam finals

Girls' doubles

Notes

References

External links

 
 
 

1997 births
Living people
Tennis players from Minsk
Belarusian female tennis players
Tennis players at the 2014 Summer Youth Olympics
Youth Olympic gold medalists for Belarus
21st-century Belarusian women